Giuseppe "Pino" Luongo (born 1952/1953)  is an American-based Italian restaurateur, businessman, and memoirist. He owned or co-owned current and former  restaurants including Il Cantinori, Le Madri, Centolire, Coco Pazzo (New York and Chicago), Coco Pazzo Cafe (Chicago), Coco Pazzo Teatro, Tuscan Square, Morso (New York) and the Wainscott, New York-based Sapore di Mare.

Early life 
Born in Florence, Italy, the eldest of six children of Antonio and Mafalda Luongo, he was raised in Tuscany's Porto Santo Stefano region, where he learned to cook from his mother. At age 19, he registered for the Italian military as a conscientious objector. Around nine years later he was called up, for which he blamed his father, a military veteran, and from whom he would remain estranged until the latter's death. He fled conscription to New York in 1981, and began his career as a busboy at a famed Italian eatery, Da Silvano, of which he would later become manager.

Career
On October 23, 1983, he opened his first establishment, Il Cantinori, with two partners. His next restaurant, which opened in 1988, was Sapore di Mare in Wainscott, Long Island. Infamous for his temperament, Luongo  earned the nickname "Pino Noir".

Publications
Luongo has written or co-written five cookbooks: A Tuscan in the Kitchen, Simply Tuscan, Fish Talking, La Mia Cucina Toscana and Two Meatballs (along with Mark Strausman). He wrote a memoir, Dirty Dishes — A Restaurateur's Story of Passion, Pain and Pasta.

Influence
In 2017, The New York Post called him "a pioneer in popularizing Tuscan cuisine in America".

Personal life
Luongo and his second wife have three children, and reside in Westchester County, New York.

References

External links
 Luongo updates, February 2009; accessed December 9, 2014.
 Huffington Post report on Luongo and Joseph Bastianich partnership, January 3, 2011; accessed December 9, 2014.

1950s births
Living people
American restaurateurs
Businesspeople from New York (state)
Italian emigrants to the United States
Date of birth missing (living people)